The 1927 Loyola Wolf Pack football team was an American football team that represented Loyola College of New Orleans (now known as Loyola University New Orleans) as an independent during the 1927 college football season. In June 1927, Loyola hired Clark Shaughnessy as its new head football coach. He had been a coach at Tulane for the prior 11 years. Shaughnessy remained at Loyola for six season; he was later inducted into the College Football Hall of Fame. In its first season under Shaughnessy, the team compiled a 6–2–2 record and outscored opponents by a total of 130 to 41.

Schedule

References

Loyola
Loyola Wolf Pack football seasons
Loyola Football